The Razorback Beds is an Early Jurassic (Sinemurian to earliest Pliensbachian) geologic formation in Queensland, Australia. Fossil ornithopod tracks have been reported from the formation.

See also 
 List of dinosaur-bearing rock formations
 List of stratigraphic units with ornithischian tracks
 Ornithopod tracks

References

Bibliography 
 Weishampel, David B.; Dodson, Peter; and Osmólska, Halszka (eds.): The Dinosauria, 2nd, Berkeley: University of California Press. 861 pp. .

Geologic formations of Australia
Jurassic System of Australia
Sinemurian Stage
Conglomerate formations
Ichnofossiliferous formations
Paleontology in Queensland